Joseph Marsh was an English professional footballer who played as a forward.

Career
Born in Hemsworth, Marsh spent his early career with Hemsworth Colliery, Brierley and South Kirkby Colliery. He joined Bradford City from South Kirkby Colliery in November 1919. He made 24 league appearances for the club, scoring 4 goals; he also scored once in 3 FA Cup matches. He left the club in August 1922 to join Castleford Town.

Sources

References

Date of birth missing
Date of death missing
English footballers
Hemsworth Colliery F.C. players
South Kirkby Colliery F.C. players
Bradford City A.F.C. players
Castleford Town F.C. players
English Football League players
Association football forwards